The Unforgettable Fire Tour was a concert tour by Irish rock band U2 that took place in 1984 and 1985 in support of band's album The Unforgettable Fire. Beginning in August 1984 with the band's first tour to Australia and New Zealand, the tour spanned four further legs which included 43 concerts in Europe and 50 in North America.

Initially challenged by the sonic complexity of the new album's material, the band were able to translate the complex layered atmospheric textures of the new studio-recorded tracks to live performance through the use of programmed sequencers, which the band until then had been reluctant to use. Since then sequencers are now used on the majority of U2 songs in performance. Songs criticised as being "unfinished", "fuzzy" and "unfocused" on the album, including the live favourite, "Bad", made more sense on stage.

For the first time, U2 consistently played in arenas instead of smaller halls and theatres, and sometimes for multiple nights. The group had reached the level of popularity where this was possible, but had not yet broken out into widespread fame and familiarity among the general rock and pop audience; that would come in 1987 with the release of The Joshua Tree.  The band's now renowned performance at Live Aid in July 1985, was watched by millions on television and brought them to a new level of fame and exposure.

Itinerary

Leg 1: Under Australian Skies

Dubbed the leg "Under Australian Skies", the band's first tour of Australia and New Zealand took place between The Unforgettable Fire's completion and its release. Plans to visit the two countries were discussed in 1982, and the band had intended to play there in late 1983 but were too tired from the War Tour. Although it had taken years to build up an audience through constant touring in Europe and North America, the band started playing sports arenas straightaway in Australia and New Zealand. The first show was on 29 August 1984 at the Town Hall Auditorium in Christchurch.

Six shows were added when the first nine sold out. 60,000 tickets were sold for five sell-out shows at the Sydney Entertainment Centre, which was the band's largest audience to date in a single city. Not having had time to rehearse the new album's songs for live performance, and as they had never played the two countries before, the band played a setlist based on the previous "War Tour". New songs from the album were rehearsed during soundchecks, and "Pride (In the Name of Love)"—which was released as the album's first single in August—and "The Unforgettable Fire" were played from the fourth date onwards. The final Australian show was on 24 September 1984 at Perth Entertainment Centre, and The Unforgettable Fire was released on 1 October 1984.

Leg 2: Europe
The tour's second leg consisted of 21 shows in halls and arenas in Western Europe, and ran during October and November 1984. Following the largely War Tour setlist and presentation of the first leg, the band adapted the shows to the dreamy nature of the new album, and transformed the visual nature of the show. Pursuing a more subtle stage presentation, the band relied more on the moods transcending from the music and lighting as opposed to Bono's active stage antics of previous tours. When "The Unforgettable Fire" song was played, for example, slides with Japanese writings and lithographs from the exhibit from which the song takes its name were projected onto a white backdrop. During "New Years Day", long white banners were lowered from the ceiling, and during "Pride", a portrait of Martin Luther King Jr. was projected. While illustrating the songs, the images were intended to bridge the gap between the audience rather than having Bono run around the stage.
 
The leg was initially meant to start in Rotterdam on 1 October, the day of the album's release, but concerts between 1 and 17 October were postponed until 1985 or cancelled to allow U2 more time to rehearse the new songs. Translating the complex layered atmospheric textures of the new studio-recorded tracks to live performance proved a serious challenge. One solution was programmed sequencers, which the band until then had been reluctant to use, on sonically elaborate new songs such as "The Unforgettable Fire" and "Bad". Since then sequencers are now used on the majority of U2 songs in performance. Songs criticised as being "unfinished", "fuzzy" and "unfocused" on the album, made more sense on stage. Rolling Stone, for example, critical of the album version of "Bad", described its live performance as a 'show stopper'.

Leg 3: North America
The third leg was 10 dates in major United States cities in December 1984, and was intended to gain positive notices in the press and provide a teaser of a major American tour in the first half of 1985. While a couple of shows were in arenas, most shows were in halls and theatres and demand for tickets significantly outstripped supply indicating that U2 would no longer be able to play these smaller venues.

Leg 4: Europe
After a five-week break, the band returned to Western Europe for 13 shows in January and February 1985, playing cities that had been missed on the previous European leg, including replacement shows for those cancelled in October 1984. The leg included 5 shows in West Germany and the band's first concert in Italy.

Leg 5: North America
The fifth leg comprised 40 shows, in 29 cities in the United States and Canada. It ran from late February to early May 1985, and was played solely in arenas for the first time, with multiple nights in many of the locations.

The band had reached the level of popularity where this was possible, but had not yet broken out into widespread fame and familiarity among the general rock and pop audience; that would come in 1987 with the release of The Joshua Tree.  The Unforgettable Fire Tour popularity level is sometimes referred to as "mass cult", and is similar to, say, what Bruce Springsteen had on his River Tour before Born in the U.S.A. or what Metallica had on their Damaged Justice tour before their Black Album.  It made for intense concerts in this instance, because it provided a very large but fully devoted audience, with fans standing on chairs for the entire performance and continuing "40" refrains long after the show was over.

Leg 6: European Summer Festivals
U2 received 12 invitations to play from European festival promoters of which they played nine from late May through to mid July 1985. Also in this period, they played a homecoming concert at Dublin's Croke Park, their first headlining show in a stadium.

Live Aid

U2 participated in the Live Aid concert at Wembley Stadium for Ethiopian famine relief on 13 July 1985. During the song "Bad", Bono leapt down off the stage to embrace and dance with a fan. Initially thinking they'd "blown it", it was a breakthrough moment for the band, showing a television audience of millions the personal connection that Bono could make with audiences.

All of U2's albums re-entered the charts in the UK after their performance. In 1985, Rolling Stone called U2 the "Band of the 80's", saying that "for a growing number of rock-and-roll fans, U2 have become the band that matters most, maybe even the only band that matters."

Performance
A fashion industry friend of Clayton's, Marian Smyth, was contacted to organise a concert wardrobe for the band. She shopped in London, Paris, and Florence and showed the band her suggestions during their May 1984 recording sessions at Slane Castle. When the band asked her for advice for someone to go manage their wardrobe on tour, she nominated herself.
  
Some Unforgettable Fire numbers were not even attempted, although "4th of July" was played over the PA as an introduction and cue for the band.

A performance of "Bad", from National Exhibition Centre in Birmingham on 11 November 1984, was released on the Wide Awake in America EP in May 1985, and was chosen by many radio programmers for airplay over the studio version.  "Bad" was also the highlight of the Live Aid performance mentioned above, and has continued to be played up through the band's 360° Tour. After being played relatively rarely during the Innocence and Experience tour, It was resurrected (with snippets of Simon & Garfunkel's "America") for the Joshua Tree Tours 2017 and 2019.

As with all U2 tours from 1983 on, the stage and lighting design for The Unforgettable Fire Tour was done by Willie Williams. In this case, the stage was plain and the lighting was very austere, mostly all white except when use of colour would be meaningful.

Supporting acts
Red Rockers and Lone Justice split the opening act assignment during the long North American leg. Matt Finish supported the band in Australia, the Mockers in New Zealand. Waterboys supported for UK dates.

Tour dates

Notes

See also
 Timeline of U2

References
Footnotes

Bibliography

External links
 U2.com
 U2 Tour site on The Unforgettable Fire Tour

U2 concert tours
1984 concert tours
1985 concert tours